A family of primitive monotrysian moths in the order Lepidoptera, Heliozelidae are small, metallic day-flying moths with shiny smooth heads. In Europe the small adult moths (genera Antispila and Heliozela) are seldom noticed as they fly quite early in the spring. The larvae are leaf miners  and the vacated leaf mines are distinctive because the larva leaves a large hole at the end.

The family is worldwide but the recently discovered genus Plesiozela from southern South America (which has five segments in the labial palps) may represent the sister group of living heliozelids (Karsholt and Kristensen, 2003).

References

Davis, D.R. (1999). The Monotrysian Heteroneura. Ch. 6, pp. 65–90 in Kristensen, N.P. (Ed.). Lepidoptera, Moths and Butterflies. Volume 1: Evolution, Systematics, and Biogeography. Handbuch der Zoologie. Eine Naturgeschichte der Stämme des Tierreiches / Handbook of Zoology. A Natural History of the phyla of the Animal Kingdom. Band / Volume IV Arthropoda: Insecta Teilband / Part 35: 491 pp. Walter de Gruyter, Berlin, New York.
Heppner, J. B. (1984). Heliozelidae. Pages 18–19 in Atlas of Neotropical Lepidoptera. 2. Checklist. pt. 1, Micropterigoidea-Immoidea. J. B. Heppner, ed. W. Junk, The Hague, Boston.
Karsholt, O. and N. P. Kristensen. 2003. Plesiozela, gen. nov. from temperate South America: apparent sister-group of the previously known Heliozelidae (Lepidoptera: Incurvarioidea: Heliozelidae). Invertebrate Systematics, 17(1): 39-46.

External links
Tree of Life
UK leaf mines and maps
UK Heliozelidae key 
Heliozelidae
UK species

 
Moth families
Taxa named by Hermann von Heinemann
Taxa named by Maximilian Ferdinand Wocke